Bernard Brewery (officially in Czech Rodinný pivovar Bernard) is a brewery in Humpolec, Czech Republic, founded in 1597. The brewery produces non-pasteurised beers. It is the biggest brewery in the Vysočina Region. In 2009, the beer was first exported to Peru, adding to its existing international markets of countries including Slovakia, Greece, Russia, Sweden, Norway, the UK, Australia, the US, Japan and Brazil.

The brewery, which employs over 150 people, produced a 231,600 hectolitres of beer in 2013 and 315,000 hectolitres of beer in 2016.

The Bernard family brewery became a joint stock company in 2000, and a year later the Belgian brewery Duvel Moortgat acquired 50% of shares.

Draught beers 
Bernard 10 – a 10° pale draught beer with 3.8% ABV.
Bernard 11 – an 11° pale lager with 4.5% ABV.
Bernard 12 – a 12° pale lager with 4.9% ABV.
Bernard Unfiltered – an unfiltered lager (10°, 11°, 12° and 14°) with 4.2% - 6.0% ABV.
Bernard Amber – a 12° semi-dark lager with 5.0% ABV.
Bernard Black Avalanche – a 12° dark lager with 5.0% ABV. It is characterized by slow whirling of foam.
Bernard Free – a pale non-alcoholic beer.
Bernard Bohemian Ale – a Strong golden ale with 8.2% ABV. Made from Bohemian hops.
Bernard India Pale Ale – an india pale ale with 5.6% ABV.

See also
 Beer in the Czech Republic

References

External links
 

Beer in the Czech Republic